The 1903 University of Florida Blue and White football team represented the University of Florida at Lake City in the sport of American football during the 1903 college football season. This was not the modern Florida Gators of the University of Florida in Gainesville, which begins in 1906, but one of its four predecessor institutions.

Schedule

References

Florida
Florida Agricultural College football seasons
Florida Agricultural College football